The Munnidae are a family of isopod crustaceans, containing these genera:
Astrurus Beddard, 1886
Echinomunna Vanhöffen, 1914
Munna Krøyer, 1839
Salvatiella Mueller, 1990
Uromunna Menzies, 1962
Zoromunna Menzies & George, 1972

References

Asellota
Crustacean families